Definiteness is a feature of noun phrases in grammatical theory.

Definiteness may also refer to:

 Counterfactual definiteness, a concept in quantum mechanics
 For the definiteness of forms in multilinear algebra, see Definite quadratic form.

See also
 Definition (disambiguation)
 Definitive (disambiguation)
 Absolutely (disambiguation)